In linguistics, verb-framing and satellite-framing are typological descriptions of a way that verb phrases in a language can describe the path of motion or the manner of motion, respectively.  Some languages make this distinction and others do not.

Manner and path 
The manner of motion refers to a type of distinct motion described by a particular verb, such as running, tumbling, sliding, walking, crawling, etc. The path of motion refers to the direction of the movement, such as movement into, out of, across, etc.  The two concepts can be encoded in the verb as part of its root meaning, or encoded in a separate particle associated with the verb (a "satellite"). Manner or path may also not be expressed at all.

Languages are considered verb-framed or satellite-framed based on how the motion path is typically encoded. English verbs use particles to show the path of motion ("run into", "go out", "fall down"), and its verbs usually show manner of motion; thus, English is a satellite-framed language. English verbs that are exceptions are mostly derived from Latin, such as "exit", "ascend", or "enter".

All Germanic languages are satellite-framed languages. Accordingly, "to go out" is hinausgehen in German, uitgaan in Dutch and gå ut in Swedish, wherein gehen / gaan / gå are equivalents of "to go", and hinaus / uit / ut are equivalents of "out". In this manner, Germanic languages can form all kinds of compounds, even less manifest ones like (German) hinaustanzen "to dance out" and so on.

On the other hand, all Romance languages are verb-framed. Spanish, for example, makes heavy use of verbs of motion like entrar, salir, subir, bajar ("go in", "go out", "go up", "go down"), which directly encode motion path, and may leave out the manner of motion or express it in a complement of manner (typically a participle): entró corriendo "he ran in", literally "he entered running"; salió flotando "it floated out", literally "it exited floating". 

The terms verb framing and satellite framing are not restricted to Romance and Germanic languages, respectively. Many languages can be assigned to one of the two systems. For example, verb framing is used in Turkish, Hebrew and Arabic. (In the last, dakhala rākiḍan means "he entered running", with the perfect form dakhala meaning "he entered" and the participle rākiḍan meaning "running".) Satellite framing is common in Greek. Some languages use both strategies. For example, Persian is chiefly verb-framed, but also has such compounds as dar-āmadan ("to come in") from dar ("in") and āmadan ("to come").

Examples from English and French

Romance languages, such as French, are normally verb-framed, and Germanic languages, such as English, are satellite-framed. This means that when expressing motion events, English speakers typically express manner in the verb, and French speakers (like Italian and Spanish speakers) typically express path in the verb, and either leave out the manner of motion completely or express it in a complement of manner. Thus for example, "He ran into the room" is routinely translated as Il est entré dans la pièce; only sometimes will it be Il est entré dans la pièce en courant ("he entered the room running"). This means, first, that the verb itself normally does not express manner in French, as opposed to what is generally the case in English; and if manner is expressed, it is expressed in a complement (or, more precisely, an adjunct) of manner: en courant ("running").

The question, then, remains of whether to express manner or not. It is not always easy to know, but manner is generally left unexpressed when it can be considered to be self-evident and can be inferred from the context; expressing the manner then tends to sound unnatural. Thus, "He ran into the room" can be translated as Il est entré dans la pièce en courant because it is slightly unusual to run into a room and so manner should be mentioned, but translating "He walked into the room" as Il est entré dans la pièce à pied ("on foot") or en marchant ("walking") is distinctly odd because it calls unintended attention to the usual way in which one enters a room. It is akin to saying in English "he entered the room walking". Only in a case where walking would be considered unusual or notable – for example, when talking about a crippled person – can the fact that he "walked" into the room be considered to be relevant. Likewise, saying "I'm flying to London" when on a plane is normal in English, but saying Je vole ("I'm flying") in French for the same situation is odd: first, because the verb is not where one should normally express manner in the first place, and also because flying is a common way of travelling to London from France.

This means that the choice of complement and in particular the choice of the preposition can also be affected: in English, the particle or the prepositional phrase (the "satellite") is where the path is expressed, with the use of a dynamic preposition: "(walk) into (the room)", "(fly) to (London)", whereas in French, it is the verb that normally expresses the path. A preposition like à ("to, at, in") is ambiguous between a static reading (Je suis à Paris/"I'm in Paris") and a dynamic reading (Je vais à Paris/"I'm going to Paris"). If the verb is dynamic and expresses directed motion (motion with an intrinsic direction), à can express movement (Je vais à Paris). If not, as is the case for instance with voler ("to fly"), which expresses manner of motion but not directed motion, à tends to receive a static and not a dynamic, interpretation: je vole à Paris would mean something like "I'm flying IN Paris", and not "I'm flying TO Paris". Using the same structure in French as directly translated from English can be doubly misleading, as the verb and the preposition are both unusual; Je vais à ("I'm going to") or Je suis en route ("I am on my way") vers/pour Paris ("towards/for Paris") are much clearer in meaning.

Opposition and its limitations

Although languages can generally be classified as "verb-framed"/"satellite-framed", this is not a mutually-exclusive classification. Languages can use both strategies, as is the case in English with the Latinate verbs such as "enter", "ascend" and "exit". The existence of equipollently-framed languages in which both manner and path are expressed in verbs has been pointed out (Slobin 2004). It could be true of Chinese, for instance.

Many Amerindian languages, such as the extinct Atsugewi, do not select verbs of motion based on path or manner. Instead, verbs of motion are specific to the kind of object that is moving or being moved.

Notes

References
Croft, W. Croft Abstracts. Retrieved December 1, 2005 from the University of Manchester, Linguistics and English Language Web site: http://lings.ln.man.ac.uk/Info/staff/WAC/WACabst.html.
Slobin, D. (2004). The many ways to search for a frog: linguistic typology & the expression of motion events. In S. Strömqvist & L. Verhoeven eds. Relating Events in Narrative. Vol 2, 219-257. Mahwah, NJ: LEA.
Slobin D. (2005), Linguistic representations of motion events: What is signifier and what is signified?, in C. Maeder, O. Fischer, & W. Herlofsky (Eds.) (2005) Iconicity Inside Out: Iconicity in Language and Literature 4. Amsterdam/Philadelphia: John Benjamins.
Talmy, L. (1991). Path to realization: A typology of event conflation. Berkeley Working Papers in Linguistics, 480-519.
Talmy, L. (2000). Toward a cognitive semantics. Volume 1: Concept structuring systems. Volume 2: Typology and process in concept structuring. Cambridge, MA: MIT Press.
Vinay, J.-P., Darbelnet J., 1958 (2004), Stylistique comparée du français et de l'anglais, Paris, Didier.

Linguistic typology
Verbs
Semantics